Everard Digby (c. 1578–1606) was a plotter in the Gunpowder Plot.

Everard Digby may also refer to:

Everard de Digby (died at Towton, 1461), MP 1446 and High Sheriff of Rutland 1459
Everard Digby (scholar) (born c.1550)
Everard Digby (died 1509), MP for Rutland
Everard Digby (died 1540) (born by 1472), MP for Rutland 1529